The AKMSU is the name attributed to a compact carbine derived from the Soviet AKM, chambered in 7.62×39mm.  The carbine was commonly thought to be a Soviet prototype weapon, but evidence suggests that the carbine was not actually of Soviet origin, and was instead a custom-made weapon misattributed as a Soviet weapon.

Origins 
The carbine that would later be attributed with the name AKMSU was first received by the British Ministry of Defense Pattern Room collection in June 1986. The Pattern Room closed in September 2005, and their entire collection was gifted to the Royal Armouries in Leeds, England, where the AKMSU resides to this day.

Following the Pattern Room's reception of the carbine, the carbine would be documented in several English and Russian publications, and the name AKMSU was later attached to the weapon. Alongside the name, the weapon was also attributed with history that describe it as a Soviet prototype weapon, made in either 1959 or 1975. Despite the description of these sources, no Russian armory documentation exists for the weapon, strongly suggesting that AKMSU was not a Soviet weapon.

The true origin of the AKMSU is uncertain, though it has been suspected to be a one-off "Khyber Pass Copy" from Pakistan's Khyber Pass region, an area known for diverse and unique weapon production in small shops.

Design 

The AKMSU is composed of a Chinese manufactured Type 56-1 receiver combined with a 1977 dated AKM trunnion. Its other custom parts include a muzzle brake, which is required for the correct functioning of the rifle and contains an expansion chamber to correctly cycle the rifle. The muzzle brake has many grooves machined into it for increased heat dispersion. It also has a custom hand guard.

Notes

References

Further reading
 Peterson, Philip. Standard Catalog of Military Firearms: The Collector's Price and Reference Guide. Lola: Gun Digest Books, 2007.

7.62×39mm assault rifles
Carbines
Kalashnikov derivatives
Rifles of Pakistan